MS was a series of four Soviet satellites launched in 1962. Two different types of satellite, 1MS and 2MS were used, with two satellites of each type being launched. Three of the satellites were operated successfully, however one of the 1MS satellites was lost in a launch failure. The three that reached orbit received Kosmos designations.

MS satellites were developed by OKB-1, and used for technology demonstration and development. They also carried payloads to investigate radiation and cosmic rays.

Launch history

See also

 1962 in spaceflight
 Dnepropetrovsk Sputnik
 List of Kosmos satellites (1–250)

References

1962 in spaceflight
1962 in the Soviet Union
Satellites of the Soviet Union
Technology demonstration satellites
Geospace monitoring satellites